The Coming of Age (La Vieillesse) is a 1970 book by the French existentialist philosopher Simone de Beauvoir, in which the author seeks greater understanding of the perception of elders.

Synopsis 
The book is a study spanning a thousand years and a variety of different nations and cultures to provide a clear and alarming picture of "Society's secret shame"—the separation and distance from our communities that the old must suffer and endure. The questions raised on the book are: what do the words elderly, old, and aged really mean? How are they used by society, and how in turn do they define the generation that we are taught to respect and love but instead castigate and avoid? Most importantly, how is our treatment of this generation a reflection of our society's values and priorities?

Summary 
"De Beauvoir has separated the book into two parts. The first half is a look from the outside in. How society and its citizens view old age, ranging from how families treat their elders to the views of old age by the philosophers and literary giants throughout the years. She breaks down the influences by particular philosophers and shows how these influences settled on the human psyche and are imbedded in the 70’s society. The second part of the book is a look from the inside out. Life through the eyes of a senior citizen, from poor to wealthy as well as famous to unknown, de Beauvoir examines the myths and realities of life as an old person in the developed world, and presents proof that despite societies' expectations, the elderly still feel the same passions as their younger counterparts. De Beauvoir addresses and challenges critically, societies' marginalization and neglect of its senior citizen population, and challenges the reader to change his or her future."

Translations 
The book was first published in Paris by Éditions Gallimard under the title La Vieillesse in 1970. The English translation was made by André Deutsch, Weidenfeld and Nicolson and G. P. Putnam's Sons in Great Britain, 1972.

References 

1970 non-fiction books
Books by Simone de Beauvoir
Works about old age